Sasaki is the 13th most common Japanese surname. Less common variants are 佐咲, 佐佐木 and 笹木. Notable people with the surname include:

Overview 
, Japanese figure skater
, Japanese alpine skier
, Japanese idol and singer
, Japanese motorcycle racer
, Japanese baseball player
, Japanese shogi player
, Japanese footballer
, Japanese race car driver
, Japanese professional wrestler
Daizo Sasaki (born 1990), Japanese kickboxer
, Japanese businessman
, Japanese musician
, Japanese Zen Buddhist
, Imperial Japanese Navy admiral
, Japanese handball player
, Japanese footballer
Hideo Sasaki (1919–2000), American landscape architect
, Japanese samurai
Hiro Sasaki, Japanese professional wrestler
, Japanese film director and screenwriter
, Japanese footballer and manager
, Japanese footballer
Hiroko Sasaki, Japanese pianist
, Japanese mime
, Japanese geneticist
, Japanese golfer
, Japanese footballer and manager
, Japanese footballer
, Japanese footballer
, Japanese voice actor, actor and singer
, Japanese swimmer
, Japanese writer and journalist
, Japanese singer-songwriter and journalist
, Japanese swimmer
, Japanese actor and voice actor
, Japanese cyclist
, Japanese baseball player
, Japanese ice hockey player
, Japanese cross-country skier
, Japanese handball player
, Japanese politician
, Japanese professional wrestler
, Japanese sprinter
, Japanese folklorist
, Japanese footballer
, Japanese swordsman
, Japanese actress, singer-songwriter, television personality and gravure idol
, Japanese photographer
, Japanese racing driver
, Japanese politician
, Japanese politician
, Japanese idol
, Japanese musician
, Japanese actor
Kyozan Joshu Sasaki (1907–2014), Japanese Zen Buddhist
Lisa Sasaki (born 1975), American museum director
, Japanese zoologist
, Japanese manga artist
, Japanese baseball player
, Japanese shogi player
Mammoth Sasaki (born 1974), Japanese professional wrestler
, Japanese screenwriter
, Japanese footballer
, Japanese footballer
, Japanese women's footballer
, Japanese filmmaker and writer
, Japanese volleyball player
, Japanese chief executive
, Japanese poet and writer
, Japanese voice actress and singer
, Japanese general
, Japanese idol and model
, Japanese writer
, Japanese actress and striptease performer
, Japanese illustrator
, Japanese long-distance runner
, Japanese daimyō
, Japanese handball player
, Japanese poet and literature academic
, Japanese manga artist
, Japanese footballer and manager
, Japanese model
, Japanese voice actress
, Japanese voice actor
, Japanese Anglican bishop
Ray Sasaki (born 1948), American trumpeter
, Japanese actress
, Japanese baseball pitcher
, Japanese swordswoman
Rui Sasaki (born 1984), glass artist from Japan
, Japanese voice actress
Ruth Fuller Sasaki (1892–1967), American Zen Buddhist
, Japanese manga artist and illustrator
, Japanese handball player
, Japanese footballer
, Japanese politician
, child victim of the atomic bombing of Hiroshima
, Japanese long-distance runner
, Japanese musician
, Japanese long-distance runner
, Japanese voice actor
Sérgio Sasaki (born 1992), Brazilian artistic gymnast
, Japanese volleyball player
, Japanese mathematician
Shigetaka Sasaki, Canadian judoka
, Japanese film producer
, Japanese badminton player
, Japanese footballer
, Japanese drummer
, Japanese slalom canoeist
, Japanese biathlete
, Japanese footballer
, Japanese Zen Buddhist
, Japanese swimmer
, Japanese boxer
, Japanese banker
, Japanese engineer
, Japanese footballer
Tadashi Sasaki (musician), Japanese classical guitarist
, Japanese footballer
, Japanese politician
, Japanese biochemist and oncologist
, Japanese samurai
, Japanese samurai
, Japanese politician
, Japanese footballer
, Japanese musician
, Japanese sport wrestler
, Japanese surgeon
, Japanese soldier
, Japanese sculptor
, Japanese alpine skier
, Japanese lawyer, politician and writer
, Japanese sailor
, Japanese journalist
, Japanese writer
Tsubasa Sasaki (born 1995), Japanese slalom canoeist
, Japanese actor and voice actor
, Japanese footballer
Yasuji Sasaki (born 1967), Japanese chef
, Japanese film director
, Japanese footballer
, Japanese voice actress and actress
, Japanese actor
, Japanese samurai
, Japanese ten-pin bowler
, Japanese mixed martial artist
, Japanese shogi player
, Japanese cricketer
, better known as Ulka Sasaki, Japanese mixed martial artist

Fictional characters
, a character in the light novel series The Melancholy of Haruhi Suzumiya
, acharacter in manga series Haikyū!!, the position is Wing Spiker
, an alias of Ken Kaneki, protagonist of the manga series Tokyo Ghoul
, a character in the video game Metal Gear Solid
"Overflowing" Sasaki, an antagonistic character of the manga series One Piece
, a character in the manga series GinTama
, a character in the manga series Laughing Under the Clouds
, a character in the manga series Negima
, a character in the manga series My Hero Academia
, a character in the manga series Cardcaptor Sakura
, a character in the anime series Samurai Champloo
, a character in the manga series Kodomo no Omocha
 Miyo Sasaki (佐々木美代), a character in the movie A Whisker Away
 Maguro Sasaki (佐々木まぐろ), a character in the video game series Puyo Puyo
 Sasaki Shuumei (佐々木 秀鳴), one of the two main characters in the manga series Sasaki and Miyano

References

See also
Sasaki clan, a samurai clan

Japanese-language surnames